The following is a list of all The Adventures of Jimmy Neutron, Boy Genius episodes. The series is based on the 2001 film Jimmy Neutron: Boy Genius.

Series overview

Episodes

Pilot (1998)

Film (2001)

Season 1 (2002–03)

Season 2 (2003–04)

Season 3 (2004–06)

Specials (2004–06)

Home media

References

External links
 

Adventures of Jimmy Neutron: Boy Genius
Adventures of Jimmy Neutron: Boy Genius